Jesús Ángel García Bragado (born 17 October 1969 in Madrid) is a Spanish race walker. He has competed at eight Olympic Games, the most Olympic appearances ever in athletics. He was married to gymnast Carmen Acedo.

Personal bests

Olympic results

Achievements

References

External links
 
 
 
 

1969 births
Living people
Spanish male racewalkers
Athletes (track and field) at the 1992 Summer Olympics
Athletes (track and field) at the 1996 Summer Olympics
Athletes (track and field) at the 2000 Summer Olympics
Athletes (track and field) at the 2004 Summer Olympics
Athletes (track and field) at the 2008 Summer Olympics
Athletes (track and field) at the 2012 Summer Olympics
Athletes (track and field) at the 2016 Summer Olympics
Olympic athletes of Spain
Athletes from Madrid
World Athletics Championships medalists
European Athletics Championships medalists
World Athletics Championships athletes for Spain
Municipal councillors in the province of Barcelona
World Athletics Race Walking Team Championships winners
World Athletics Championships winners
Athletes (track and field) at the 2020 Summer Olympics